The Goldene Peitsche is a Group 3 flat horse race in Germany open to thoroughbreds aged three years or older. It is run at Baden-Baden over a distance of 1,200 metres (about 6 furlongs), and it is scheduled to take place each year in late August or early September.

History
The event was established in 1867, and the inaugural running was won by Cobweb. It was initially held at Tempelhof, and was transferred to Hoppegarten in 1868.

The race was switched to Grunewald in 1918, and it returned to Hoppegarten in 1923. It was not run from 1945 to 1947, and for brief spells thereafter it was staged at Cologne (1948) and Mülheim (1949, 1950 and 1952).

The Goldene Peitsche moved to Baden-Baden in 1953. It was given Group 3 status in 1973, and was promoted to Group 2 level in 1991. It was downgraded to Group 3 in 2014 only. But returned Group 2 in 2015, during Sprint Races programme update. In August 2018, Raven's Lady from England won the 148th Casino Baden-Baden Golden Whip.

Records
Most successful horse (3 wins):
 Altgold – 1899, 1900, 1901
 Oberwinter – 1927, 1928, 1929

Leading jockey (7 wins):
 Egbert Fisk – Johannes (1868), Reform (1869), Das Veilchen (1871), Sonntag (1873), Templer (1876), Schmetterling (1878), Valerius (1882)

Leading trainer (8 wins):
 Adrian von Borcke – Laotse (1933), Dardanos (1936), Florida (1939), Figaro (1942), Ticino (1944), Atatürk (1955), Fallott (1957), Niobe (1958)
 (note: the trainers of some of the early winners are unknown)

Winners since 1965

Earlier winners

 1867: Cobweb
 1868: Johannes
 1869: Reform
 1870: Ghuznee
 1871: Das Veilchen
 1872: Flibustier
 1873: Sonntag
 1874: Lulu
 1875: Lulu
 1876: Templer
 1877: Recorder
 1878: Schmetterling
 1879: Picklock
 1880: Donnerkeil
 1881: Consul
 1882: Valerius
 1883: Glocke
 1884: Weltmann
 1885: Amorosa
 1886: Triftig
 1887: C-Dur
 1888: Blücher
 1889: Orcan
 1890: Dalberg
 1891: Dalberg
 1892: Orcan
 1893: Königswinter
 1894: Milchmann
 1895: Ausmärker
 1896: Undolf
 1897: Jenny Lind
 1898: Goldregen
 1899: Altgold
 1900: Altgold
 1901: Altgold
 1902: Bärenhäuter
 1903: Saskia
 1904: Monopol
 1905: Holländer
 1906: Olaf
 1907: Holländer
 1908: Fabula
 1909: Faust
 1910: Abendluft
 1911: Fervor
 1912: Flagge
 1913: Lena
 1914: Festtarok
 1915: Grandezza
 1916: Ladylove
 1917: Blätterteig
 1918: Blätterteig
 1919: Optimist
 1920: Kolmerhof
 1921: Wallenstein
 1922: Sardanapal
 1923: Ischida
 1924: Bafur
 1925: Sinir
 1926: Grossinquisitor
 1927: Oberwinter
 1928: Oberwinter
 1929: Oberwinter
 1930: Rochus
 1931: Napoleon
 1932: Rochus
 1933: Laotse
 1934: Janitor
 1935: Janitor
 1936: Dardanos
 1937: Feurige
 1938: Gela
 1939: Florida
 1940: Kumbuke
 1941: Rexow
 1942: Figaro
 1943: Caramelle
 1944: Ticino
 1945–47: no race
 1948: Nachtfalke
 1949: Honved
 1950: Antonius
 1951: no race
 1952: Antonius
 1953: Liebesmahl
 1954: Baal
 1955: Atatürk
 1956: Liebeslied
 1957: Fallott
 1958: Niobe
 1959: Wettcoup
 1960: Adlon
 1961: Erdball
 1962: Victorina
 1963: Anatol
 1964: Bow Tie

See also
 List of German flat horse races

References

 Racing Post / siegerlisten.com:
 1983, 1984, 1985, 1986, 1987, 1988, 

 galopp-sieger.de – Goldene Peitsche.
 horseracingintfed.com – International Federation of Horseracing Authorities – Goldene Peitsche (2014).
 pedigreequery.com – Goldene Peitsche – Baden-Baden.

Open sprint category horse races
Horse races in Germany
Recurring sporting events established in 1867
Sport in Baden-Württemberg
1867 establishments in Germany